Valverde Del Camino is a town in the Huelva province of Spain. As of 2008 it has 12,000 inhabitants. It is known for its production of vaquero-style leather boots, specifically of the campero style, and for its whole leather industry as well, dating back from the early 18th century which today incorporates several small manufactures in the collective Botas De Valverde del Camino trademark.

References

Municipalities in the Province of Huelva